Crassispira tasconium is a species of sea snail, a marine gastropod mollusk in the family Pseudomelatomidae.

Description
The length of the shell attains 23 mm, its diameter 9.5 mm.

The fusiform shell is dark white or straw-colored. It contains 8–10 whorls (in the holotype the protoconch is lacking). The suture is profoundly impressed. The whole build of the shell is coarse, though of a light rather than massive consistency. Particularly conspicuous are the spiral sulci deeply furrowing the summit of each whorl, leaving a narrow noduled space between them and the sutures. The ovate aperture has a dark interior. The thin outer lip is slightly expanded. The sinus is wide and deep. The white columella is straight. The siphonal canal is short and straight.

Distribution
This marine species occurs in the Gulf of Oman

References

External links
 

tasconium
Gastropods described in 1901